The 2022–23 Louisville Cardinals men's basketball team represented the University of Louisville during the 2022–23 NCAA Division I men's basketball season. The team played its home games on Denny Crum Court at the KFC Yum! Center in downtown Louisville, Kentucky as members of the Atlantic Coast Conference (ACC). They were led by first-year head coach Kenny Payne. 

The team's 0–9 start was its worst since the 1940–41 season, when the Cardinals began the season 0–11. Before their first win of the season against Western Kentucky on December 14, 2022, the Cardinals contended with California for the worst start in modern history for any team that was at the time a member of a power conference, defined here as a member of a Power Five conference or the Big East Conference. California was the first such team to fall to 0–7, doing so on November 26, 2022; Louisville reached that mark three days later. California fell to 0–12 before its first win of the season. The Cardinals' start was still the worst for any team in ACC history.

Previous season
The Cardinals finished the 2021–22 season 13–19, 6–14 in ACC play to finish in a three-way tie for 11th place.  As the No. 11 seed in the ACC tournament, they defeated Georgia Tech before losing to Virginia in the second round. 

Head coach Chris Mack was fired on January 26, 2022 after starting the season 11–9. Associate coach Mike Pegues was named the interim coach for the remainder of the season. On March 16, the school named former Louisville player Kenny Payne the team's new head coach.

Offseason

Departures

Incoming transfers

2022 recruiting class

2023 recruiting class

Roster

Schedule and results

|-
!colspan=12 style=| Exhibition

|-
!colspan=12 style=| Regular season

|-
!colspan=12 style=| ACC Tournament

Schedule Source:

Rankings

*AP does not release post-NCAA tournament rankings^Coaches did not release a Week 2 poll.

References

Louisville Cardinals men's basketball seasons
Louisville
Louisville Cardinals men's basketball, 2020-21